Charles W. Hodgdon (September 5, 1861 – September 27, 1948) was an American politician in the state of Washington. He served in the Washington House of Representatives from 1917 to 1919.

References

Democratic Party members of the Washington House of Representatives
1861 births
1948 deaths